The Seethalakshmi Achi College for Women, Pallathur ,  is a Government Aided Arts and Science College.
This college was founded by Shri O.A.Pr.M.Arunachalam Chettiar in honour of his wife Smt. Seethalakshmi Achi and located in Pallathur, Tamil Nadu. It was established in the year 1962. The college is affiliated with Alagappa University. This college offers different courses in arts, commerce and science.

Accreditation
The college is  recognized by the University Grants Commission (UGC).

References

External links

Educational institutions established in 1962
1962 establishments in Madras State
Colleges affiliated to Alagappa University